Annona cordifolia is a species of plant in the Annonaceae family. It is native to Bolivia, Brazil, Columbia and Peru.

Description
It is a tree reaching 15 meters in height.  Its petioles are 10-13 millimeters long.  Its leaves are 15-25 by 7-12 centimeters with round or gently pointed tips.  The base of the leaves often form a small notch at the attachment to the petiole giving the leaf blade a heart shape.  The mature leaves are hairless above except on the veins, and slightly hairy beneath.  Its flowers are on pedicels that are 3-4 centimeters long. Its sepals have long threadlike tips.  Its flowers have 3 oval petals about 1.5 centimeters in length.  Its fruit is ellipsoid, hairy, gray fruit is 4-5 by 2-3 centimeters.

Reproductive biology
The pollen of Annona cordifolia is shed as permanent tetrads.

References

External links
 

cordifolia
Flora of Brazil
Flora of Bolivia
Flora of Colombia
Flora of Peru
Taxa named by Eduard Friedrich Poeppig